Yvonne Schuring (born 4 January 1978 in Wolfen, East Germany) is an Austrian sprint canoer who competed in the late 2000s. Together with teammate Viktoria Schwarz, she won gold at the 2011 World Championships in the K-2 500 m event.  She won a bronze in the same event at the 2010 ICF Canoe Sprint World Championships in Poznań with the same teammate.

At the 2008 Summer Olympics in Beijing, Schuring and Schwarz finished ninth in the K-2 500 m event.  At the 2012 Summer Olympics in London, Schuring and Schwarz came 5th in the same event.

In June 2015, she competed in the inaugural European Games, for Austria in canoe sprint, more specifically, Women's K-1 500m. She earned a silver medal.

References

External links
 

1978 births
Living people
People from Bitterfeld-Wolfen
People from Bezirk Halle
Austrian female canoeists
Sportspeople from Saxony-Anhalt
Canoeists at the 2008 Summer Olympics
Canoeists at the 2012 Summer Olympics
Canoeists at the 2016 Summer Olympics
Olympic canoeists of Austria
ICF Canoe Sprint World Championships medalists in kayak
European Games medalists in canoeing
Canoeists at the 2015 European Games
European Games silver medalists for Austria
20th-century Austrian women
21st-century Austrian women